Wellman is an unincorporated community in Massie Township, Warren County, in the U.S. state of Ohio.

History
Variant names were "Henpeck", "Hen Peck", and "Wells". A post office called Henpeck was established in 1890, the name was changed to Wellman in 1894, and the post office closed in 1901.

References

Unincorporated communities in Warren County, Ohio